High Wages is a 1930 novel by the British writer Dorothy Whipple. One of her first novels, it follows a young woman who rises from being a worker in a dress shop to owning her own business in the years after the First World War. It was an instant commercial success and established Whipple as a popular writer over the following two decades. As part of a revival of interest in her work, it was republished by Persephone Books in 2009.

References

Bibliography
 Boyiopoulos, Kostas, Patterson, Anthony and Sandy, Mark (ed.) Literary and Cultural Alternatives to Modernism: Unsettling Presences. Routledge, 2019.
 Plock, Vike Martina. Modernism, Fashion and Interwar Women Writers. Edinburgh University Press, 2017.
 Sponenberg, Ashlie. Encyclopedia of British Women’s Writing 1900–1950. Springer,  2006.

1930 British novels
Novels by Dorothy Whipple
Novels set in England
Novels set in the 1910s
John Murray (publishing house) books